Marion Township is one of twelve townships in Dubois County, Indiana. As of the 2010 census, its population was 1,501 and it contained 767 housing units.

History
Marion Township was created from land given by Bainbridge, Hall, Columbia, Harbison, and Patoka townships.

Geography

Unincorporated towns
 Dubois

Adjacent townships
 Harbison Township (north)
 Columbia Township (northeast)
 Hall Township (east)
 Jackson Township (south)
 Bainbridge Township (west)

Major highways
  Indiana State Road 164

References
 United States Census Bureau cartographic boundary files
 U.S. Board on Geographic Names

External links

 Indiana Township Association
 United Township Association of Indiana

Townships in Dubois County, Indiana
Jasper, Indiana micropolitan area
Townships in Indiana